Persib Bandung U-20 is an Indonesian football team located in Bandung, West Java, Indonesia. They are the reserve team from Persib Bandung. Their most common nickname is Maung Ngora (The Young Tigers).

History
They won the 2009–10 Indonesia Super League U-21 after beating Pelita Bandung Raya U-21 2–0 in the final. Munadi also got the best player award that season.

Stadium 
Persib U-21 play their home matches at Si Jalak Harupat Stadium.

Shirt sponsor 
The shirt sponsor for 2015 Indonesia Super League U-21 will be Indofood and Salvus Prima.

2019 squad 
The following players are eligible for Liga 1 U-20 in the current 2019 Liga 1 U-20 season.

Notable former players 

  Atep
  Dedi Kusnandar
  Febri Haryadi
  Gian Zola
  Henhen Herdiana
  Ferdinand Sinaga
  Jajang Mulyana
  Jajang Sukmara
  Dias Angga Putra
  Hanif Sjahbandi
  Ryuji Utomo
  Sutanto Tan
  I Nyoman Adi Parwa
  Abdul Aziz
  Muhammad Natshir
  Andritany Ardhiyasa
  Yudi Khoerudin
  Johan Juansyah
  Eka Ramdani
  Yandi Sofyan
  Zaenal Arief
  Munadi
  Rendi Saputra
  Muhammad Agung Pribadi
  Budiawan
  Rudiyana
  Wildansyah
  Sigit Hermawan

Coaches 
  Indra Thohir (2008–2009) 
  Mustika Hadi (2009–2010)
  Asep Sumantri (2010–2011)
  Mustika Hadi (2011–2012) 
  Yusuf Bachtiar (2013) 
  Jaino Matos (2014)
  Budiman Yunus (2015–present)

Source:

Honours 
Indonesia Super League U-21 
 Champion: 2009–10

References

External links 
 Official site 

Football clubs in Indonesia
Persib Bandung